John Hatton was an Anglican priest in England during the early 16th Century.

Hatton was educated at the University of Oxford. He was appointed a suffragan bishop to Thomas Savage, Archbishop of York in 1503 and  Archdeacon of Nottingham in 1506. Hatton died on 25 April 1516, and is buried in York Minster.

Notes 

Alumni of the University of Oxford
Archdeacons of Nottingham
16th-century English Anglican priests
1516 deaths
Suffragan bishops
Diocese of York